Deb Adair (born April 22, 1966, in Manchester, Connecticut) is an American re-recording mixer. 
She won 3 Emmy Awards for Outstanding Film Sound Mixing and Outstanding Sound Mixing - Special Class for her work on Aladdin in 1995-1996 and Timon & Pumbaa in 1997. On January 24, 2012, she was nominated for an Academy Award for the movie Moneyball.

Adair attended Syracuse University in the TV, Radio, and Film Production program.

See also
 84th Academy Awards

References

External links
 
 

Living people
American audio engineers
1966 births
Daytime Emmy Award winners
Women audio engineers
Re-recording mixers
People from Manchester, Connecticut